The Omani records in swimming are the fastest ever performances of swimmers from Oman, which are recognised and ratified by the Oman Swimming Association.

All records were set in finals unless noted otherwise.

Long Course (50 m)

Men

Women

Short Course (25 m)

Men

Women

References

Oman
Records
Swimming
Swimming